Jammu  is the winter capital of the Indian union territory of Jammu and Kashmir. It is the headquarters and the largest city in Jammu district of the union territory. Jammu is the second most populous city of the union territory. Three battles have been fought in the city: first by the founder Raja Mal Dev against Timur in Battle of Jammu (1399), second by Sardar Bhag Singh against Mughal army in Battle of Jammu (1712) and the third by Mian Dido & Maharaja  Gulab Singh against Ranjit Singh's army in Battle of Jammu (1808).

Known as the City of Temples for its ancient temples and Hindu shrines, Jammu is the most visited place in the union territory. Jammu city shares its borders with the neighbouring Samba district.

Etymology
According to local tradition, Jammu is named after its founder, Raja Jambulochan, who is believed to have ruled the area in the 9th century. The local tradition holds the city to be 3000 years old but this is not supported by historians.

Geography

Jammu city lies at uneven ridges of low heights at the Shivalik hills. It is surrounded by the Shivalik range to the north, east, and southeast while the Trikuta Range surrounds it in the northwest.

The city spreads around the Tawi river with the old city overlooking it from the north (right bank) while the new neighbourhoods spread around the southern side (left bank) of the river. There are five bridges on the river. The city is built on a series of ridges.

History
According to Tarikh-i-Azmi, Jammu came into existence around 900 CE. The state of Durgara (modern forms "Duggar" and "Dogra)") is also attested from around this time. The capital of the Durgara state at that time is believed to have been Vallapura (identified with modern Billawar). Its rulers are repeatedly mentioned in Kalhana's Rajatarangini. Babbapura (modern Babor) is another state mentioned in Rajatarangini, some of whose rulers occur in the Vamshavali (family chronicles) of later Jammu rulers. These rulers are believed to have enjoyed almost independent status and allied themselves with the Sultans of Delhi. Raja Bhim Dev is prominently mentioned in the Delhi chronicles as a supporter of Mubarah Shah.

Jammu is mentioned by name in the chronicles of Timur, who invaded Delhi in 1398 and returned to Samarkand via Jammu. In the Mughal chronicles of Babur in the early 16th century, Jammu is mentioned as a powerful state in the Punjab hills. It is said to have been ruled by Manhas Rajputs. Emperor Akbar brought the hill kingdoms of the region under Mughal suzerainty, but the kings enjoyed considerable political autonomy. In addition to Jammu, other kingdoms of the region such as Kishtwar and Rajauri were also prominently mentioned. It is evident that the Mughal empire treated these hill chiefs as allies and partners in the empire.

Modern history

After the decline of the Mughal power in the 18th century, the Jammu state under Raja Dhruv Dev of the Jamuwal (Jamwal) family asserted its supremacy among all the Dugar states. Its ascent reached its peak under his successor Raja Ranjit Dev (r. 1728–1780), who was widely respected among the hill states. Ranjit Dev promoted religious freedom and security, which attracted many craftsmen and traders to settle in Jammu, contributing to its economic prosperity.

Towards the end of Ranjit Dev's rule, the Sikh clans of Punjab (misls) gained ascendency, and Jammu began to be contested by the Bhangi, Kanhaiya and Sukerchakia misls. Around 1770, the Bhangi misl attacked Jammu and forced Ranjit Dev to become a tributary. Brij Lal Dev, Ranjit Dev's successor, was defeated by the Sukerchakia chief Mahan Singh, who sacked Jammu and plundered it. Thus Jammu lost its supremacy over the surrounding country. In 1808, Jammu itself was annexed to the Sikh Empire by Maharaja Ranjit Singh, the son of Mahan Singh.

In 1818 Raja Kishore Singh Father of Raja Gulab Singh was appointed and anointed the ruler of Jammu Principality hence started the Jamwal Dynasty, aka Dogra dynasty, which came to rule the princely state of Jammu and Kashmir under British suzerainty. The rulers built large temples, renovated old shrines, built educational institutes and many more. A 43 km long railway line connecting Jammu with Sialkot was laid in 1897

Jammu has historically been the capital of Jammu Province and the winter capital of the princely state of Jammu and Kashmir (1846–1952).

After the partition of India, Jammu continues as the winter capital of the Indian state of Jammu and Kashmir.

Battles

 Battle of Jammu (1712)
 Battle of Jammu (1808)

Climate

Jammu, like the rest of north-western India, features a humid subtropical climate (Köppen Cwa), with extreme summer highs reaching , and temperatures in the winter months occasionally falling below . The city is exposed to heatwaves.

Transport

Jammu city has a railway station called Jammu Tawi (station code JAT) that is connected with major cities of India. The old railway link to Sialkot was suspended by Pakistan in September 1947, and Jammu had no rail services until 1971, when the Indian Railways laid the Pathankot-Jammu Tawi Broad Gauge line. The new Jammu Tawi station was opened in October 1972 and is an origination point for Express trains.
With the commencement of the Jammu–Baramulla line, all trains to the Kashmir Valley will pass through Jammu Tawi. A part of the Jammu–Baramulla project has been executed and the track has been extended to Katra. Jalandhar - Pathankot - Jammu Tawi section has been doubled and electrified.

National Highway 44  which passes through Jammu connects it to the Kashmir valley. National Highway 1B connects Jammu with Poonch town.

Jammu Airport is in the middle of Jammu. It has direct flights to Srinagar, Delhi, Amritsar, Chandigarh, Leh, Mumbai and Bengaluru. Jammu Airport operates daily 30 arrival and departure of flights which are served by Go First, Air India, SpiceJet, IndiGo and Vistara.

The city has JKSRTC city buses and minibusses for local transport which run on some defined routes. These minibusses are called "Matadors". Besides this auto-rickshaw and cycle-rickshaw service is also available. Local taxis are also available.

Administration

Jammu city serves as the winter capital of Jammu and Kashmir state from November to April when all the offices move from Srinagar to Jammu. Srinagar serves as the summer capital from May to October. Jammu was a municipal committee during 2001 census of India. With effect from 5 September 2003, it has upgraded status of a municipal corporation.

Economy
Jammu city is the main cultural and economic centre of the administrative division of Jammu. One of the most famous local Basmati rice is produced in the RS Pura area near Jammu, which is then processed in rice mills in Jammu. Apart from rice mills scattered all around Jammu, industrial estate at Bari Brahamna has a large presence of industrial units manufacturing a variety of products right from carpets, electronic goods, electric goods.

Tourism

Tourism is the largest industry in Jammu city. It is also a focal point for the pilgrims going to Vaishno Devi and Kashmir valley as it is second last railway terminal in North India. All the routes leading to Kashmir, Poonch, Doda and Laddakh start from Jammu city. So throughout the year, the city remains full of people from all the parts of India. Places of interest include old historic palaces like Mubarak Mandi Palace, Purani Mandi, Rani Park, Amar Mahal, Bahu Fort, Raghunath Temple, Ranbireshwar Temple, Karbala, Peer Meetha, Old city.

Demographics

As of 2011 census, the population of Jammu city was 502,197. Males constituted 52.7% of the population; females numbered constituted 47.3% of the population. The sex ratio was 898 females per 1,000 males against the national average of 940. Jammu had an average literacy rate of 89.66%, much higher than the national average of 74.4%: male literacy was 93.13% and female literacy was 85.82%. 8.47% of the population were under 6 years of age. The urban agglomeration of Jammu had a population of 657,314. Most of Jammu and Kashmir's Hindus live in the Jammu region; many speak Dogri,.

Muslim communities

The city of Jammu had a significant Muslim population prior to the Partition of India, 30.4 per cent by the 1941 census. During the 1947 Jammu massacres, which preceded and continued during the Pakistan tribal invasion of Kashmir, many Muslims were killed and many driven away to Pakistan. The estimates of the number killed in the whole province vary between 20,000 and 100,000. The killings were carried out by extremist Hindus and Sikhs, allegedly orchestrated by the Rashtriya Swayamsevak Sangh, and aided and abetted by the state forces and the Maharaja Hari Singh. As a result of the violence and migration, by 1961, about 17.2 per cent of the population in the city of Jammu was Muslim. The displaced Muslims took refuge in the Sialkot District and other parts of Pakistani Punjab. Many prominent Punjabi residents in Pakistan, including politician Chaudhry Amir Hussain, economist Mahbub ul Haq, Air Marshal Asghar Khan, journalist Khalid Hasan and singer Malika Pukhraj were from Jammu. A large number of these refugees also returned and resettled in the territory.

Education

In the 2014–2015 General Budget of India, Arun Jaitley, the Finance Minister of India, proposed an Indian Institute of Technology and an Indian Institute of Management for the division. List of some educational institutions is provided below.

Engineering Colleges in Jammu:-
 Indian Institute of Technology Jammu
 Government College of Engineering and Technology, Jammu
 Model Institute of Engineering and Technology, Jammu
 Yogananda College of Engineering and Technology, Jammu
 University Institute of Engineering and Technology, University of Jammu

Medical Institutions:-
 Indian Institute of Integrative Medicine, CSIR
 Government Medical College, Jammu

Legal Institutions:-
 Kishen Chand Law College, Jammu
 Dogra Law College, Jammu
 Calliope School of Legal Studies, Jammu
 R. K. Law College, Jammu

General Degree Courses (colleges):-
 Govt. Gandhi Memorial Science College, Jammu
 Govt. MAM PG College, Jammu

Universities:-
 Central University of Jammu
 Sher-e-Kashmir University of Agricultural Sciences and Technology of Jammu
 University of Jammu

Schools
 Kendriya Vidyalaya, Bantalab
 Kendriya Vidyalaya, Sunjuwan

Cuisine

Jammu is known for its sund panjeeri, patisa, rajma with rice and Kalari cheese. Pickles typical of Jammu are made of kasrod, mango with saunf, jimikand, and potatoes. Auriya is a dish made with potatoes. Jammu cuisine features various chaats, especially gol gappas, kachalu, Chole bhature, gulgule, rajma kulche and dahi palla, among various others.

Refugees

Kashmiri Pandit refugees

Being comparatively safe from terrorism, Jammu city has become a hub of refugees. These primarily include Kashmiri Hindus who migrated from Kashmir Valley in 1989. Hindus from Pakistan administered Jammu and Kashmir who migrated to India have also settled in Jammu city. As per the records approximately 31,619 Hindu families had migrated from Pakistan administered Jammu and Kashmir to India, out of them 26,319 families are settled in Jammu.

Rohingya refugees

Rohingyas who fled Myanmar during 2016 have also currently settled in Jammu. Some believes the settlements of Rohingya Muslims have also raised security threats in Jammu. During the 2018 Sunjuwan attack, intelligence agencies had suspected involvement of Rohingya Muslims in the attack, but the involvement was not proved.

Notable people
 

Maulana Abdur Rahman, member of the 2nd Lok Sabha

References

Bibliography

External links

 
Cities and towns in Jammu district

Indian capital cities
Capitals of former nations
Former capital cities in India
Cities in Jammu and Kashmir